The Communist Party of Cuba (PCC) is the sole ruling party of Cuba. It was founded on 3 October 1965 as the successor to the United Party of the Cuban Socialist Revolution, which was in turn made up of the 26th of July Movement and Popular Socialist Party that seized power in Cuba after the 1959 Cuban Revolution. The party governs Cuba as an authoritarian one-party state where dissidence and political opposition are prohibited and repressed. The Cuban constitution ascribes the role of the party to be the "leading force of society and of the state".

The highest body within the PCC is the Party Congress, which convenes every five years. When the Congress is not in session, the Central Committee is the highest body. Because the Central Committee meets twice a year, most day-to-day duties and responsibilities are vested in the Politburo. Since April 2021, the First Secretary of the Central Committee has been Miguel Díaz-Canel, who has been serving as President of Cuba since 2018.

Marxism–Leninism, a fusion of the original ideas of German philosopher and economic theorist Karl Marx, and Russian revolutionary Vladimir Lenin, was gradually formalized as the party's guiding ideology and remains so to this day. The party pursued state socialism, under which all industries were nationalized, and a command economy was implemented throughout Cuba despite the long-term embargo by the United States. The PCC also supports Castroism and Guevarism and is a member of the International Meeting of Communist and Workers' Parties.

History 

Cuba had a number of communist and anarchist organizations from the early period of the Republic (founded in 1902). The original "internationalised" Communist Party of Cuba formed in the 1920s. In 1944, it renamed itself as the Popular Socialist Party for electoral reasons. In July 1961, two years after the successful overthrow of Fulgencio Batista and the creation of a revolutionary government, the Integrated Revolutionary Organizations (ORI) was formed from the merger of:
 Fidel Castro's 26th of July Movement
 The Popular Socialist Party led by Blas Roca
 Parts of the student-based Revolutionary Directory led by Faure Chomón

On 26 March 1962, the ORI became the United Party of the Cuban Socialist Revolution (PURSC), which in turn became the Communist Party of Cuba on 3 October 1965. In Article 5 of the Cuban constitution of 1976, the Communist Party is recognized as "the superior guiding force of society and of the State, that organizes and orients common efforts toward the high goals of the construction of socialism and the advancement toward communist society". All parties, including the Communist Party, are prohibited from publicly advertising their organizations.

For the first fifteen years of its formal existence, the Communist Party was almost completely inactive outside of the Politburo. The 100 person Central Committee rarely met and it was ten years after its founding that the first regular party Congress was held. In 1969, membership of the party was only 55,000 or 0.7% of the population, making the PCC the smallest ruling communist party in the world. In the 1970s, the party's apparatus began to develop. By the time of the first party Congress in 1975, the party had grown to just over two hundred thousand members, the Central Committee was meeting regularly and provided the organizational apparatus giving the party the leading role in society that ruling Communist parties generally hold. By 1980, the party had grown to over 430,000 members and it grew further to 520,000 by 1985. Apparatuses of the party had grown to ensure that its leading cadres were appointed to key government positions.

The Eighth Congress took place from 16 to 19 April 2021, during which Miguel Díaz-Canel was elected as the First Secretary of the Central Committee, taking over from Raúl Castro. José Ramón Machado Ventura was Second Secretary from 2011 to 2021. Abelardo Álvarez Gil also remains Head of the Department of Organization and Staff Policy.

Organization 
The PCC governs Cuba as an authoritarian one-party state where dissidence and political opposition are prohibited and repressed.

Congresses 

The Communist Party of Cuba held its first party Congress in 1975 and has had additional congresses in 1980, 1986, 1991, 1997 and 2011. The Seventh Congress took place from 19 to 22 April 2016, around the 55th anniversary of the Bay of Pigs Invasion, concluding with remarks by Fidel Castro.

Central Committee 

The leading bodies of the party were the Politburo and the Secretariat until 1991 when the two bodies were merged into an expanded Politburo with over twenty members. However, the Secretariat was re-introduced in 2002. There is also a Central Committee which meets between party congresses. At the Fifth Congress, the size of the Central Committee was reduced to 150 members from the previous membership of 225. Fidel Castro was the party's First Secretary (or leader) since its inception while Raúl Castro was the Second Secretary. Upon Fidel Castro's 2008 resignation from the party and Cuban government, Raúl Castro became First Secretary.

Politburo 

A 14-strong Politburo was elected by the 1st Plenary Session of the Central Committee on 19 April 2021 following the 8th Congress.

Secretariat 

A 6-strong Secretariat was elected by the 1st Plenary Session of the Central Committee on 19 April 2021 following the 8th Congress.

Mass organizations related to the PCC 
 Young Communist League, (UJC founded in 1962 by Fidel Castro), youth group of future militants of the PCC
 Workers' Central Union of Cuba, (CTC, founded in 1939 by Blas Roca and Lázaro Peña), a Cuban trade union center
 Federation of Cuban Women, (FMC, founded in 1960 by Fidel Castro and Vilma Espín), a centralized women's organization
 National Association of Small Farmers, (ANAP, founded in 1961 by Fidel Castro), a peasant organization
 José Martí Pioneer Organization, (OPJM, founded in 1977 by Fidel Castro), student organization (pioneers)
 Student Federation of Secondary Education, (FEEM, founded in 1970 by Fidel Castro), student organization (pre)
 University Student Federation, (FEU, founded in 1922 by Julio Antonio Mella), student organization (university)
 Committees for the Defense of the Revolution, (CDR, founded in 1960 by Fidel Castro), community work organization
 Association of Combatants of the Cuban Revolution, (ACRC, founded in 1993 by Fidel Castro), organization of active and retired military personnel
 Union of Journalists of Cuba, (UPEC, founded in 1963 by Fidel Castro), a centralized organization of journalists

Youth 
The Communist Party of Cuba has a youth wing, the Young Communist League (Unión de Jóvenes Comunistas, UJC) which is a member organization of the World Federation of Democratic Youth. It also has a children's group, the José Martí Pioneer Organization.

Ideology 
The party is officially a Marxist–Leninist party that is dedicated to the establishment of communism. Since the Cuban Revolution, the party has also followed the doctrines of Castroism (the ideology of Fidel Castro, including some elements of social conservatism and inspiration from José Martí) and Guevarism.

Economy 
The party has been more reluctant in engaging in market reforms, though it has been forced to accept some market measures in its economy due to the dissolution of the Soviet Union and the resultant loss of economic subsidies. Raúl Castro, after becoming the leader of the party, campaigned to "renew" Cuba's socialist economy through incorporating new exchange and distribution systems that have been traditionally seen as "market" oriented. This has led to some speculation that Cuba may transition towards a model more similar to a socialist market economy like that of China or a socialist-oriented market economy like that of Vietnam. Private property and the need for foreign investment were recognized in the new constitution promulgated in 2019.

Foreign relations 
The Communist Party of Cuba has often pursued an interventionist foreign policy, actively assisting left-wing revolutionary movements and governments abroad, including the ELN in Colombia, the FMLN in El Salvador, the Sandinistas in Nicaragua, and Maurice Bishop's New Jewel Movement in Grenada. The party's most significant international role was in the civil war in Angola, where Cuba directed a joint Angolan/Soviet/Cuban force in the Battle of Cuito Cuanavale. More recently, the party has sought to support Pink Tide leaders across Latin America, such as Hugo Chávez and later Nicolás Maduro in Venezuela and Evo Morales in Bolivia.

Medical diplomacy has also been a prominent feature of the Party's foreign policy. The party maintains a policy of sending thousands of Cuban doctors, agricultural technicians, and other professionals to other countries throughout the developing world. The party also supports Latin American integration.

Electoral history

National Assembly elections

Notes

References

Further reading 
 Barry Carr. Tim Rees and Andrew Thorpe (eds.). "From Caribbean Backwater to Revolutionary Opportunity: Cuba's Evolving Relationship with the Comintern, 1925-34". International Communism and the Communist International, 1919-43. Manchester. Manchester University Press. 1998.
 "First Congress of the Communist Party of Cuba: Havana, December 17-22, 1975 (Collection of Documents)".
 Fidel Castro. "Main Report, Second Congress of the Communist Party of Cuba" (December 1980).

External links 

  

 
Parties of one-party systems
Political parties in Cuba
Far-left political parties
Ruling communist parties
International Meeting of Communist and Workers Parties